The United Steel Companies was a steelmaking, engineering, coal mining and coal by-product group based in South Yorkshire and Lincolnshire, England.

History
The company was registered in 1918 and the following year saw a joining together of steel makers Samuel Fox and Company of Stocksbridge; Steel, Peech and Tozer of Templeborough and Ickles in Rotherham; the Appleby-Frodingham Steel Company of Scunthorpe; and the coal mining and by-products interests of Rother Vale Collieries at Orgreave, Treeton and Thurcroft.

Over the years other companies were added to the portfolio:

The Sheffield Coal Company, owners of Birley Collieries, Brookhouse and North Staveley collieries, was bought by the United Steel Companies in 1937. This also included coal by-product operations at Orgreave and Brookhouse, suppliers of Metallurgical Coke for Blast Furnaces.

The Kiveton Park Colliery Company was taken over in 1944 with reserves from, amongst others, the Barnsley seam being an attractive proposition. The facilities also included coke and coal by-products (including gas). The colliery interests became part of the National Coal Board at nationalisation. The coke ovens closed in 1956 and the colliery closed in 1984.

In 1945 the mining portfolio was increased with the purchase of the  Shireoaks Colliery Company, the colliery being just over the Nottinghamshire border. As with all their collieries this became part of the National Coal Board in 1947.

The Yorkshire Engine Company was bought by the United Steel Companies Limited in 1948. It was said there were two reasons for the purchase. With United Steels wanting new locomotives following the end of World War II the opportunity arose to purchase the company at a good price and also a suggestion to centralise the  engineering workshops which would serve their steelworks at Templeborough (Rotherham) and Stocksbridge. The works, at Meadowhall, closed in 1967.

The iron and steel works on nationalisation became part of British Steel Corporation and the mining interests passed to the National Coal Board. The coal by-products plants came under the ownership of a subsidiary, The United Coke and Chemical Company.

Nowadays the steel interests at Rotherham and Stocksbridge are part of Tata Steel,  the steel plant in Scunthorpe part of the new British Steel, and all the mining interests have been closed, the last, at Treeton, in the 1990s.

Cybor House
With the appointment of Stafford Beer in 1956, the United Steel Companies became one of the pioneers of management cybernetics. They installed a Ferranti Pegasus computer in Cybor House, located in Tapton House Road, Sheffield. This was the first computer specifically dedicated to management cybernetics.

References

 Official Company Handbook
 Various Issues of the internal works newspaper "Steel News"

1918 establishments in England
1967 disestablishments in England
Coal companies of the United Kingdom
Companies based in Scunthorpe
Companies disestablished in 1967
Companies formerly listed on the London Stock Exchange
Defunct companies based in Sheffield
Defunct companies based in Yorkshire
Rotherham
Steel companies of the United Kingdom
British companies established in 1918
Manufacturing companies established in 1918